Beáta Újhelyi (born 1 June 1980) is a Hungarian swimmer. She competed in the women's 200 metre individual medley event at the 1996 Summer Olympics.

References

1980 births
Living people
Hungarian female medley swimmers
Olympic swimmers of Hungary
Swimmers at the 1996 Summer Olympics
Swimmers from Budapest
20th-century Hungarian women
21st-century Hungarian women